Sycoscapter is a genus of non-pollinating fig wasp which is native to the Afrotropical, Indomalayan and Australasian realms. They are parasitoids of fig wasps in the Ceratosolen, Eupristina and Kradibia genera.

References

External links 

 Figweb

Pteromalidae
Hymenoptera genera
Hymenoptera of Australia